Guy Fawkes (1570–1606) was a conspirator in the Gunpowder Plot.

Guy Fawkes may also refer to:
 Guy Fawkes (novel), a novel by William Harrison Ainsworth
 Guy Fawkes (film), a 1923 British silent historical film
 Isla Guy Fawkes, an island of the Galapagos Islands
 Guy Fawkes River, a river in New South Wales, Australia
 Guy Fawkes River National Park

See also
 Bridgwater Guy Fawkes Carnival, an annual festival
 Guy Fawkes mask
 Guy Fawkes Night, an annual celebration of the foiling of the plot, on November 5
 Guido Fawkes, a political blog